South Carolina is a state located in the Southern United States. According to the 2020 United States Census, South Carolina is the 23rd most populous state with  inhabitants, but the 40th largest by land area spanning  of land. South Carolina is divided into 46 counties and contains 271 municipalities consisting of 71 cities and 200 towns.

At incorporation,  municipalities may choose to be named either "City of" or "Town of", however there is no legal difference between the two. All municipalities are responsible for providing local service including law enforcement, fire protection, waste and water management, planning and zoning, recreational facilities, and street lighting. Municipalities may incorporate with one of three forms of government: 141 chose mayor-council, 95 chose council, and 33 chose council-manager. Under the mayor-council form of government, an elected municipal council is composed of a mayor and four or more council members. The mayor's responsibilities include: staffing of all municipal employees; directing and supervising the administration of all departments, offices, and agencies; voting in, and presiding over, council meetings; and preparing the annual budget (with council), capital program (with council), and public financial reports. Under the council form of government, the council can be composed of five, seven or nine members including the mayor, all elected, and each with one vote on council. The council has the power to levy taxes and raise funds from other sources that match the operating and capital budgets. Under the council-manager form of government, the council is composed of a mayor and four, six, or eight councilmen each with one vote. The municipality must employ a manager, establish administrative departments upon recommendation of the manager, adopt an annual budget, provide an independent annual audit of the books and business affairs of the municipality, provide for the general health and welfare of the municipality, and enact ordinances of any nature and kind. The manager is the head of the administrative branch of the municipal government and is responsible for staffing (including the hiring, firing and compensation of all municipal employees), preparing the annual budget and financial report for council adoption.

The largest municipality by population in South Carolina is the city of Charleston with 150,227 residents, and the smallest municipality by population is Cope with 37 residents.

List

See also
South Carolina census statistical areas
List of census-designated places in South Carolina
List of unincorporated communities in South Carolina

Notes

References

External Links 

Municipal Association of South Carolina - A voluntary association for South Carolina municipalities.

South Carolina
 
Cities and towns
South Carolina